Booby Dupes is a 1945 short subject directed by Del Lord starring American slapstick comedy team The Three Stooges (Moe Howard, Larry Fine and Curly Howard). It is the 84th entry in the series released by Columbia Pictures starring the comedians, who released 190 shorts for the studio between 1934 and 1959.

Plot
The Stooges are fish peddlers (similar to their roles in 1940's Cookoo Cavaliers) who decide to cut out the middleman by catching the fish themselves. They then go about purchasing fishermen uniforms and a boat. While searching for their wardrobe, Curly manages to swipe a navy captain's uniform from the same guy (Vernon Dent) whose girl (Rebel Randall) Curly decides to overly flirt with.

After the debacle with the lady, the gents reconvene, and go about trading in their car and raising an additional $300 for a propeller boat that ends up being a "lemon." No sooner are the Stooges on the ocean when their boat starts to sink. They climb aboard their spare dinghy, and signal some passing planes for help. Unfortunately, they signal using a white rag with a large red paint-splatter in the center, making it resemble the flag of Japan. The planes overhead turn out to be bombers who believe the Stooges are Japanese, and promptly bomb the trio.  Amidst the bombing, Moe creates a makeshift motor out of a propeller and Curly's victrola, and the trio make a mad dash out of there.

Production notes
Filmed on September 27–30, 1944, Booby Dupes is a partial remake of the 1932 Laurel and Hardy short film Towed in a Hole. In addition, the gag of a victrola acting as a car radio appeared in the duo's 1932 film Busy Bodies. The title is a play on the line "boop-oop-a-doop" from the song "I Wanna Be Loved by You," made famous by singer Helen Kane and by the Fleischer Studios cartoon character Betty Boop.

This is one of a few shorts in which one of the boys call themselves "the Stooges", screamed by Moe as the bomber tries to sink their boat.

This is also the final episode in the Curly era directed by Del Lord, who would direct his last episode with the Stooges in Shivering Sherlocks with Shemp Howard, thus making it the only film he directed with Shemp as a member of the Stooges.

During World War II, the Stooges released a handful of comedies that engaged in propaganda against the then-enemy Japanese, including Spook Louder, No Dough Boys, Booby Dupes, and The Yoke's on Me.

Curly Howard's mannerisms and reactions had been starting to slow down. In Booby Dupes, his condition varies; he is in top form at the beginning and end of the film, but appears somewhat sluggish during the middle sequence involving his stealing navy Capt. Vernon Dent's uniform and flirting with girlfriend Rebel Randall.

References

External links 
 
 
Booby Dupes at threestooges.net

1945 films
Columbia Pictures short films
The Three Stooges films
American black-and-white films
Films directed by Del Lord
1945 comedy films
1945 short films
1940s English-language films
1940s American films